Welcome Home may refer to:

Film 
Welcome Home (1925 film), an American silent film directed by James Cruze
Welcome Home (1935 film), an American comedy film directed by James Tinling
Welcome Home (1989 film), an American film directed by Franklin Schaffner
Welcome Home (2004 film), an Austrian film directed by Andreas Gruber
Welcome Home (2006 film), a Spanish film directed by David Trueba
Welcome Home (2018 film), an American film directed by George Ratliff

Music 
The Welcome Home, an American indie rock band

Albums
Welcome Home (Brian Littrell album) or the title song (see below), 2006
Welcome Home (Carole King album), 1978
Welcome Home (Hellyeah album) or the title song, 2019
Welcome Home (Kane & Abel album) or the title song, 2003
Welcome Home (Osibisa album) or the title song, 1975
Welcome Home (Rehab album) or the title song, 2010
Welcome Home (Richard "Groove" Holmes album), 1968
Welcome Home ('Til Tuesday album), 1986
Welcome Home (Zac Brown Band album), 2017
Welcome Home: Live at the Arlington Theatre, Santa Barbara 1992, by Toad the Wet Sprocket, 2004
Welcome Home, by All the Young, 2012
Welcome Home, by Jacob Fred Jazz Odyssey, 1998
Welcome Home, by Ron Kenoly, 1996

Songs
"Welcome Home" (1918 song), written by Bud Green and composed by Edward G. Nelson
"Welcome Home" (Coheed and Cambria song), 2005
"Welcome Home" (Dave Dobbyn song), 2005
"Welcome Home" (Peters and Lee song), 1973
"Welcome Home" (Radical Face song), 2007
"Welcome Home (You)", by Brian Littrell, 2006
"Welcome Home", by Bachman–Turner Overdrive from Bachman-Turner Overdrive II, 1973
"Welcome Home", by Idlewild from Warnings/Promises, 2005
"Welcome Home", by King Diamond from Them, 1988
"Welcome Home", by Laverne Cox, 2019
"Welcome Home", written by Irving Berlin
"Welcome Home (Sanitarium)", by Metallica from Master of Puppets, 1986

Other uses
Welcome Home, Arkansas
"Welcome Home" (Third Watch), a television episode
"A Welcome Home", an episode of Barney & Friends
Welcome Home, a play starring Pernell Roberts
Welcome Home, a 2018 American television show that aired as part of the One Magnificent Morning programming block

See also